Avasarpiṇī is the descending half of the cosmic time cycle in Jainism and the one in which the world is said to be at present. According to Jain texts the Avasarpiṇī is marked by a decline in goodness and religion. The ascending half of the cycle is called utsarpiṇī, which is marked by the ascent of goodness and religion.

Overview 
Jaina cosmology divides the worldly cycle of time (kalpakāla) in two parts or half-cycles (kāla) – ascending (utsarpiṇī) and descending (avasarpiṇī) – each consisting of 10 x 1 crore x 1 crore addhāsāgaropama (10 kotikotī sāgaropama). Thus, one cycle of time (kalpakāla) gets over in 20 kotikotī sāgaropama.

During the ascending period (utsarpiṇī) of the half-cycle (kāla), in the regions of Bharata and Airāvata, there is the all-round increase in age, strength, stature and happiness of the living beings, while during the descending period (avasarpiṇī) of the half-cycle, there is the all-round deterioration. Each half-cycle is further divided into six periods of time. The periods in the descending (avasarpiṇī) half-cycle are termed as:
 susamā-susamā, of 4 kotikotī sāgaropama
 susamā, of 3 kotikotī sāgaropama
 susamā-dusamā, of 2 kotikotī sāgaropama
 dusamā-susamā, of 1 kotikotī sāgaropama minus 42,000 years
 dusamā, of 21,000 years
 dusamā-dusamā, of 21,000 years

Six periods of time 

 Suṣama-suṣamā (read as Sukhma-sukhma) – During the first period of the Avasarpiṇī, people lived for three palyopama years. During this ara (era or period) people were on average six miles tall. They took their food on every fourth day; they were very tall and devoid of anger, pride, deceit, greed and other sinful acts. Various kinds of the kalpavriksha fulfilled their wishes and needs like food, clothing, homes, entertainment, jewels etc.
 Suṣamā (read as Sukhma) – During the second period, people lived for two palyopama years. During this ara (era), people were on average 4 miles tall. They took their food at an interval of three days, but the kalpavriksha supplied their wants, less than before. The land and water became less sweet and fruitful than they were during the first ara.
 Suṣama-duḥṣamā (read as Sukhma-dukhma) – During the third period, the age limit of the people became one palyopama year. During this ara people were on average 2 miles tall. They took their food on every second day. The earth and water as well as height and strength of the body went on decreasing and they became less than they were during the second ara. The first three ara the children were born as twins, one male and one female, who married each other and once again gave birth to twins. On account of happiness and pleasures, the religion, renunciation and austerities was not possible. At the end of the third ara, the wish-fulfilling trees stopped giving the desired fruits and the people started living in the societies. The first Tirthankara, Rishabhanatha, was born at the end of this period. He taught the people the skills of farming, commerce, defence, politics and arts (in total 72 arts for men and 64 arts for women) and organised the people into societies. That is why he is known as the father of human civilisation.
 Duḥṣama-suṣamā (read as Dukhma-sukhma) – The fourth period was the age of religion, where renunciation, austerity and liberation were possible. The 63 Śalākāpuruṣas, or the illustrious persons who promote the Jain religion, regularly appear in this ara. The remaining 23 Tīrthaṅkars, including Lord Māhavīra, appeared in this ara. 
 Duṣama (read as Dukhma) – According to Jain texts, currently we are in the fifth period. As of 2016, exactly 2,540 years have elapsed and 18,460 years are still left. It is an age of sorrow and misery. The maximum age a person can live to in this ara is not more than 125 years. The average height of people in this ara is six feet tall. No liberation is possible, although people practice religion in lax and diluted form. At the end of this ara, even the Jain religion will disappear, only to appear again with the advent of 1st Tirthankara in the next cycle.
 Duṣama – duṣama (read as Dukhma-dukhma)- The sixth period will be the age of intense misery and sorrow, making it impossible to practice religion in any form. The age, height and strength of the human beings will decrease to a great extent. In this era people will live for no more than 16–20 years. This trend will start reversing at the onset of utsarpiṇī kāl.

Panchama kāla 
The fifth period (dusamā) of the avasarpiṇī is generally called Panchama Kāla. According to Jain texts, we are presently living in this period of time which started after 3 years and 8-and-a-half months of the liberation (nirvāṇa) of the 24th Tīrthankara Mahāvīra. It is said that at the end of this period, humans will be no more than one cubit in height, and twenty years in age. Bharata Chakravartin is said to have seen 16 dreams which were related to this period. These were explained by Tirthankara Rishabhanātha.

See also
Jain cosmology

References

Citation

Sources
 
 

Jain cosmology